Geronimo's Cadillac may refer to:
 Geronimo's Cadillac (album), a 1972 album by Michael Martin Murphey
 "Geronimo's Cadillac" (Michael Martin Murphey song)
 "Geronimo's Cadillac" (Modern Talking song) (1986)